Westringia lurida is a species of plant in the mint family that is endemic to Australia. It occurs in the Mallee region of north-western Victoria.

References

lurida
Lamiales of Australia
Flora of Victoria (Australia)
Taxa named by Michel Gandoger
Plants described in 1918